Granet is a French surname. Notable people with the surname include:
 André Granet,  French architect
 Edward John Granet (1858-1918), British army officer
François Marius Granet (1777–1849), French painter
Guy Granet (1867–1943), British railway administrator
Marcel Granet (1884–1940), French sociologist
Bert Granet (1910–2002), American television producer
Roger Granet (born 1947), psychiatrist, psycho-oncologist, and author and editor of several books on understanding mental disorders and diseases.

French-language surnames